Michael Carter (18 April 1960 – 12 November 2018) was an English professional footballer who played as a winger. He played in the English football league for Bolton Wanderers, Mansfield Town, Swindon Town, Plymouth Argyle, Hereford United and Wrexham, and Kitchener Spirit.

Carter passed away at the age of 58 in November 2018, but his death was not reported until almost four years later.

References

1960 births
2018 deaths
English footballers
Footballers from Warrington
Association football wingers
Bolton Wanderers F.C. players
Mansfield Town F.C. players
Swindon Town F.C. players
Plymouth Argyle F.C. players
Hereford United F.C. players
Wrexham A.F.C. players
Colne Dynamoes F.C. players
English Football League players
Kitchener Spirit players